Chef Boyardee is an American brand of canned pasta products sold internationally by Conagra Brands. The company was founded by Italian immigrant Ettore Boiardi in Milton, Pennsylvania, U.S., in 1928.

History

After leaving his position as head chef at the Plaza Hotel in New York City, Ettore Boiardi opened a restaurant called Il Giardino d'Italia in 1924 at East 9th Street and Woodland Avenue in Cleveland, Ohio. The idea for Chef Boiardi came about when restaurant customers began asking Boiardi for his spaghetti sauce, which he began to distribute in milk bottles. Four years later, in 1928, Boiardi opened a factory and moved production to Milton, Pennsylvania, where he could grow his own tomatoes and mushrooms. He decided to anglicize the name of his product to "Boy-Ar-Dee" to help Americans pronounce his name correctly. The first product to be sold was a "ready-to-heat spaghetti kit" in 1928. The kit included uncooked pasta, tomato sauce, and a container of pre-grated cheese.

The U.S. military commissioned the company during World War II for the production of army rations, requiring the factory to run 24 hours a day. At its peak, the company employed approximately 5,000 workers and produced 250,000 cans per day. After the war ended, Boiardi had to choose between selling the company or laying off everyone he had hired. He sold the company to American Home Foods in 1946 for nearly $6 million, and remained as a spokesman and consultant for the brand until 1978. American Home Foods turned its food division into International Home Foods in 1996. Four years later, International Home Foods was purchased by ConAgra Foods, which continues to produce Chef Boyardee canned pastas bearing Boiardi's likeness.

Products
Chef Boyardee products are available in cans or single-use microwavable cups.

Throwback recipes 

 Spaghetti & balls
 Meat Lovers Pasta
 Mini Ravioli Beef Ravioli
 Beef Ravioli
 Beefaroni
 Lasagna

Spaghetti 

 Spaghetti & Meatballs (can, microwavable cup)
 Jumbo Spaghetti & Meatballs (can)
 Mini Spaghetti & Meatballs (can)
 Mini Spaghetti Rings & Meatballs (can, microwavable cup)

Beefaroni 

 Beefaroni (can, microwavable cup)
 Big Beefaroni (can)

Ravioli 

 Beef Ravioli (can, microwavable cup)
 Mini Ravioli (can)
 Chicken Ravioli (can)
 Cheese Ravioli In Tomato Sauce (can)
 Cheese Ravioli In Meat Sauce (microwavable cup)
 Overstuffed Beef Ravioli (can)
 Overstuffed Italian Sausage Ravioli (can)
 Mini Beef Ravioli & Meatballs (can, microwaveable Cup)
 Mini Micro Beef Ravioli (microwaveable cup)

Lasagna 

 Lasagna (can, microwavable cup)

Fun Flavors 

 Pasta With Chicken And Vegetables (microwave cup)
 Cheesy Rice (microwave cup)
 Spaghetti In Tomato Sauce (microwave cup)
 Pasta In Butter Sauce (can, microwaveable cup)
 Paw Patrol (can, microwavable cup)
 Mac & Cheese (can, microwavable cup)
 Rice With Chicken & Vegetables (microwavable cup)
 Cheesy Burger Macaroni (can)
 Mini ABC's & 123's With Meatballs (can, microwavable cup)
 Mini ABC's & 123's Without Meatballs (can)
 Chicken Alfredo (can)
 Mini Pasta Shells & Meatballs (can, microwavable cup)

Pizza & Sauces 

 Cheese Pizza Maker
 Pepperoni Pizza Maker
 Pizza Sauce With Cheese
 Spaghetti sauce With Meat

Discontinued products
As of 2021, the following products are no longer in production.

Advertising
In 2018, Barbara Lippert of Advertising Age compared the 1966 Young & Rubicam ad for Beefaroni to The 400 Blows and running of the bulls. The ad features a large group of children running through Venice singing, "Hooray...for Beefaroni!" Lippert believed the ad influenced other famous commercials such as Prince Spaghetti (known for "Anthony! Anthony!") and "Hilltop" for Coca-Cola.

Chef Boyardee is one of the only brands to request to be removed from an episode of Seinfeld. In the episode "The Rye", Kramer is allowed to operate a Hansom cab for a week, and feeds the horse excess cans of Beefaroni, which causes frequent and foul smelling flatulence. As a result of the request, the name was changed to "Beef-a-reeno".

In 2005, Chef Boyardee was shown in MasterCard's "Icons" commercial during Super Bowl XXXIX, which depicts advertising mascots having dinner together.

Legal issues 
In 2015, a class-action lawsuit was brought against the Chef Boyardee company. The lawsuit alleged false advertisement on the part of Chef Boyardee. Their product labels stated that they contained no preservatives, yet they contained citric acid. The plaintiff who filed the class-action lawsuit was demanding more than $5 million in damages. The lawsuit was dismissed in 2016.

See also
 SpaghettiOs
 Ettore Boiardi
 Conagra Brands

References

External links

Official site
Hector Boiardi (Encyclopedia of Cleveland History)
Gallery of classic graphic design featuring Chef Boyardee
1960s TV ad for Beefaroni

Conagra Brands brands
Food advertising characters
Male characters in advertising
Mascots introduced in 1928
Products introduced in 1928
Defunct companies based in Cleveland
Companies based in Northumberland County, Pennsylvania
Pasta
Canned food
Italian-American cuisine

fr:Chef Boyardee